OSF St. Joseph Medical Center is a 149-bed Level II trauma center hospital complex in Bloomington, Illinois, USA, and is part of the OSF Healthcare System.

St. Joseph Hospital accepted its first patient on 1880.  The original hospital was a two-story brick mansion on Jackson Street.  The current site on East Washington Street was opened in the 1960s.

Among the hospital's claims of firsts in central Illinois were the first successful Caesarian section birth; the 1929 first blood transfusion; first successful radiation therapy in the 1940s; the 1990 first open heart surgery; and first "beating heart surgery", in which the heart is not stopped, in 2000.

References

External links
 
 OSF St. Joseph Medical Center on YouTube

Hospitals established in 1880
1880 establishments in Illinois
Bloomington, Illinois
Hospitals in Illinois
Joseph Medical Center, Saint
Buildings and structures in Bloomington–Normal